International Bridges to Justice (IBJ) is a non-governmental organization based in Geneva, Switzerland. The organization's stated mission is "to protect the basic legal rights of ordinary citizens in developing countries by guaranteeing all citizens the right to competent legal representation, the right to be protected from cruel and unusual punishment, and the right to a fair trial". IBJ has the additional stated goal "to end torture in this Century".

History 

IBJ was founded in 2000 by former public defender Karen I. Tse in response to her time spent working as a Fellow for refugees in Southeast Asia in the 1980s and then as a trainer for Cambodia’s first core group of public defenders in 1994. After witnessing numerous violations of citizens' legal rights, Tse enrolled at the Harvard Divinity School in 1997, where she began devising the business plan for International Bridges to Justice.

Principles

IBJ only works in countries whose international treaty obligations and national laws have already laid the legal framework for the protection of their citizens and where a Memorandum of Understanding has been signed with the relevant government and legal authorities, setting out the parameters under which IBJ will work.

Work

IBJ adopts a three pillar approach to accomplishing its aims:

 Providing technical support and training to criminal defense lawyers
 Organizing justice sector roundtable sessions to bring together all of the key stakeholders in the criminal justice system, including defenders, prosecutors, judges, police, detention center officials, local government representatives and legal academics
 Raising rights awareness amongst the populations in the countries where the organization is active

Programs

Criminal defense trainings and workshops

IBJ's main method of furthering its aim of criminal justice reform is through training public defenders, or legal aid lawyers, in countries throughout the developing world. IBJ has developed a range of interactive criminal defense trainings, which include international best practices, specific hypothetical situations and country-specific legal informational and case studies.

IBJ Fellows

IBJ recruits emerging lawyers in the field of human rights to work in Defender Resource Centers in their respective countries, which serve as the basic infrastructure for programming, as well as the support and resource hub for local defenders and neutral meeting ground for dialogue between judicial stakeholders. IBJ provides training and support to the Fellows, who go on to head the IBJ Country Programs and to provide legal aid to the local population.

JusticeMakers

JusticeMakers is an online community created by IBJ to share information and best practice models in different criminal justice systems. Community members are members of the global criminal defense community.  The JusticeMakers program hosts an annual criminal justice innovation competition that awards project funding to grassroots legal rights projects in communities around the world.

Legal Training Resource Center

The  IBJ Legal Training Resource Center is aimed at increasing public defender capacity worldwide through the creation of on-demand web-based eLearning courses.

The Criminal Defense Wiki

The Criminal Defense Wiki is an IBJ project that allows law students, professors, and experienced criminal defense practitioners from around the world to create an internet resource for criminal defense lawyers.

Country focus

International Bridges to Justice began its work in Asia, but has since expanded and has programs running throughout the world. 
Asia
Afghanistan
Azerbaijan
Bangladesh
Cambodia
China
Georgia
India
Indonesia
Malaysia
Nepal
Pakistan
Philippines
Singapore
Sri Lanka
Vietnam

Africa
Burundi
Cameroon
Democratic Republic of Congo
Kenya
Malawi
Nigeria
Rwanda
Swaziland
Uganda
Zimbabwe

South America
Argentina
Bolivia
Brazil
Chile
Colombia
Paraguay

External links
International Bridges to Justice
IBJ Blog
Legal Training Resource Center
Defensewiki.ibj.org
JusticeMakers

References
11."Karen Tse – On a Mission to End Torture in 93 Countries" published on 99Faces.tv 2018-03-29

Organisations based in Geneva
Criminal justice reform